The Sevierville Police Department, sometimes referred to as "SPD", is the primary law enforcement organization serving Sevierville, Tennessee in the United States.

Patrol Division
The primary uniformed division of the department which includes vehicle and bicycle patrols. The reserve unit is attached to the Patrol Division.  The Patrol Division Commander, a Captain, also oversees the department's special operations, including SWAT, K9, Bomb Team, and Crash Reconstruction.  Other Patrol Division functions include the field training program, in-service training management, and community resource services.

Currently, the Patrol Division operates using a 12-hour shift model and staffs four patrol shifts and one community resource shift.  Each shift is supervised by a Lieutenant, aided by a Sergeant.  Each patrol shift also has an K9 team attached.

Operational Support Services Division
The Division includes Criminal Investigations, SRO Officers, Communications, and Records.

Rank structure

See also

 List of law enforcement agencies in Tennessee

Municipal police departments of Tennessee
Sevier County, Tennessee